This page shows the all-time medal table for the Commonwealth Games since the first British Empire Games in 1930. The table is updated as of 8 August 2022, the day the 2022 Commonwealth Games in Birmingham ended.
These rankings sort by the number of gold medals earned by a country. The number of silvers is taken into consideration next and then the number of bronze. If, after the above, countries are still tied, equal ranking is given and they are listed alphabetically. This follows the system used by the IOC, IAAF and BBC. The source for this data are the tallies listed at the Commonwealth Games Federation's website.

Medal table 
*Note : Nations in italics no longer participate at the Commonwealth Games.
Updated after 2022 Commonwealth Games,

 Totals for Ghana include all medals won as 
 Totals for Zimbabwe include all medals won as 
 Totals for Zambia include all medals won as 
 Totals for Sri Lanka include all medals won as 
 Totals for Guyana include all medals won as

Nations and territories without medals

Current Commonwealth members
As of the end of the 2022 Commonwealth Games.

 Won at least one medal at a Commonwealth Youth Games

Former Commonwealth members

 Total for the Federation of South Arabia includes appearance as 
 An athlete from this territory had previously won a medal as part of

See also

All-time Olympic Games medal table

Notes

References

 Commonwealth Games official website
 The Commonwealth Games: The History of all the Sports, Bob Phillips 2002, Parrs Wood Press Manchester.

 
Commonwealth Games-related lists